Tamanend is an unincorporated community in Schuylkill County, in the U.S. state of Pennsylvania.

History
The community was named after Tamanend, a Native American chieftain.

References

Unincorporated communities in Pennsylvania
Unincorporated communities in Schuylkill County, Pennsylvania